A partial lunar eclipse will take place on Saturday, June 15, 2030.

Visibility

Related lunar eclipses

Lunar year series

Tritos series 
 Preceded: Lunar eclipse of July 16, 2019

 Followed: Lunar eclipse of May 16, 2041

Tzolkinex 
 Preceded: Lunar eclipse of May 5, 2023

 Followed: Lunar eclipse of July 27, 2037

Half-Saros cycle
A lunar eclipse will be preceded and followed by solar eclipses by 9 years and 5.5 days (a half saros). This lunar eclipse is related to two annular solar eclipses of Solar Saros 147.

See also
List of lunar eclipses and List of 21st-century lunar eclipses

Notes

External links

2030-06
2030-06
2030 in science